Scierus is a genus of crenulate bark beetles in the family Curculionidae. There are at least three described species in Scierus.

Species
These three species belong to the genus Scierus:
 Scierus annectans LeConte, 1876
 Scierus annectens LeConte, 1876
 Scierus pubescens Swaine, 1924

References

Further reading

 
 
 

Scolytinae
Articles created by Qbugbot